Two Lick Creek is a drainage basin measuring approximately , and is the largest tributary of Blacklick Creek, located in Indiana County, Pennsylvania in the United States.

Tributaries
Yellow Creek (Two Lick Creek)

See also
List of rivers of Pennsylvania

References

External links
U.S. Geological Survey: PA stream gaging stations

Rivers of Pennsylvania
Tributaries of the Kiskiminetas River
Rivers of Indiana County, Pennsylvania